The Japan women's national basketball team is administered by the Japan Basketball Association.

At the 2020 Summer Olympics, Japan won the silver medal, the nation's first Olympic basketball medal (for men or women) and became the first Asian team to reach the podium in women's basketball since China in 1992. The Japanese, which were coached by Tom Hovasse, excelled in an 87–71 win over France in the semi-finals before coming short 75–90 against the United States. Japan's Rui Machida set an Olympic record with 18 assists against France.

, Japan has been the reigning Champion of the Asia-Oceania region.

Competitive record

FIBA World Cup
1964 – 9th place
1967 – 5th place
1971 – 5th place
1975 –  2nd place
1979 – 6th place
2010 – 10th place
2014 – 14th place
2018 – 9th place
2022 – 9th place

Olympic Games
1976 – 5th place
1996 – 7th place
2004 – 10th place
2016 – 8th place
2020 –  2nd place

FIBA Women's Asia Cup
 Gold: (1970, 2013, 2015, 2017, 2019, 2021)
 Silver: (1965, 1968, 1974, 1997, 1999, 2001, 2004)
 Bronze: (1976, 1978, 1980, 1982, 1984, 1990, 1992, 1994, 1995, 2007, 2009, 2011)

Asian Games
 Gold: (1974, 1998)
 Silver: (1994)
 Bronze: (1978, 1982, 1986, 2006, 2010, 2014, 2018)

Team

Current roster
Roster for the 2022 FIBA Women's Basketball World Cup.

Coaches
Masayuki Katsura
Masatoshi Ozaki
Masami Komori
Zhang Tixin
Kazuo Nakamura (basketball)
Takeshi Ishikawa
Hideo Enomoto
Fumikazu Nakagawa
Norihiko Kitahara
Tomohide Utsumi
Junichi Ara
Tom Hovasse

See also
Japan women's national under-19 basketball team
Japan women's national under-17 basketball team
Japan women's national 3x3 team

References

External links

FIBA profile
Japan Basketball Records at FIBA Archive

 
Women's national basketball teams